William Naish may refer to:
 William Naish (Quaker)
 William Naish (painter)

See also
 William Nash (disambiguation)